Ahmed Zaki Metwally Abdelrahman Badawi (18 November 1949 – 27 March 2005), usually known as Ahmed Zaki, was an Egyptian film actor. He was characterized by his talent, skill, and ability in impersonating. He was also famous for his on-screen intensity. Though he first appeared in a small role within a comedy play, he is widely regarded as one of the most talented male actors, especially in dramatic and tragedy roles. Zaki has Worked in six films that has Ben listed in the Top 100 Egyptian films.

Early days 
He graduated from Zagazig's Crafts School in 1967, and then traveled to Cairo to study cinema before he graduated from the Cairo Higher Institute for Drama Studies in 1974.

Highlights 
Many of his films were written by screenwriter Wahid Hamed and had a strong political message that exposed governmental and police corruption. He also starred in the famous 1980s television comedy musical series Howa we heya with actress Soad Hosny. Zaki also starred in a series of successful action movies during the mid-and late-1990s.

Two of his greatest successes were playing Egypt's presidents in two popular movies that became landmarks of Arabic cinema. He played presidents Gamal Abdel Nasser in Nasser 56, a movie that centered on the fateful summer of 1956 when then-President Nasser nationalizing the Suez Canal, and Anwar Sadat in the movie The Days of Sadat (2001) with director Mohamed Khan which he also produced. The movie depicted 40 years of the late president's life. He also had plans to play president Hosni Mubarak in a third movie. In 1980s, Zaki had the chance to act alongside Salah Zulfikar who was nicknamed Al-Abqary ("The Genius" – a reference to his popularity among Egyptians for combining success in both acting and film production), the two starred together in two movies. He was also known for portraying prominent characters in Egyptian history like Taha Hussein.

Zaki was seen as an icon and spokesperson for the average Egyptian youth; he was also considered the heir to Farid Shawki who was nicknamed Malek El Terso ("The King of the Third Class" – a reference to his popularity among the poor, who bought third-class seats in movie theatres) in an Egyptian magazine. The two starred together in two movies several years earlier.

He was a known heavy smoker. Zaki had been in intensive care at Dar Al Fouad Hospital in Sixth of October City, just outside Cairo, and died of lung cancer complications, after president Hosni Mubarak offered to send him to France for medical treatment at the government's expense and granted him the Merit of Arts award for his work in over 50 movies.

A book about Zaki has been released under the title of Ahmad Zaki wa Symphoniet Ibda (Ahmad Zaki: A Symphonic Innovation Masterpiece). The book features details of his acting career and includes a compilation of articles by different critics, including Tareq Al Shinawi, Mohammad Al Shafe’ee and Waleed Saif.

Tribute 
On November 18, 2020, Google celebrated his 71st birthday with a Google Doodle, which included boxing gloves to refer to Al Nimr Al Aswad (The Black Tiger), a crab for Kaboria (The Crab), a camera for Edhak El-Sora Tetlaa’ Helwa (Smile, the Picture Will Come Out Fine), and the animals from Arba’a Fi Muhimma Rasmiya (Four on an Official Mission).

Filmography in order of release dates 

1974: Abnaa Al-Samt (The Children of Silence) – Mahmoud
1978: El Omr Lahza (Life is a Moment)
1979: Alexandria... Why? – Ibrahim 
1979: Shafika and Metwali
1980: Al Batneyya – Safrot
1981: Maowid ala ashaa – Shukri
1981: Ana La Aktheb Wlakenani Atajaml – Ibrahim
1981: Taer ala el tariq – Fares
1981: Oyun la tanam
1982: El-akdar el-damia – Kher
1982: 
1983: Darb El Hawa – Abdel Aziz
1983: El Ehteyat Wageb – Hassan
1983: Al modmen
1984: "El-nemr El'eswed" (The Black Tiger) - Muhammed Hassan
1984: El-Raqesah wa el-Tabbal – Abdo
1984: El Lela AL Mawooda – Fathi 
1984: The Prince – Prince Yousef Othman Basha
1984: Al-Takhshiba – Majdy El Douski
1985: Saad El Yateem – Zakaria
1985: Howa wa heya (Him & Her) (TV Mini-Series) –  Afifi Abu Al Naja / Mahrous Al Dishnawi Shawqi / Moonis Khalil / Majdi / Metwalli / Nader / Khaled / Medhat / Jalal 
1986: Shader al-samak – Ahmad Abu Kamel
1986: Love on the Pyramids Plateau
1986: Al Bedaya (The Beginning)
1986: The Innocent – Ahmad Saba' Al Layl
1987: Arba’a Fi Muhimma Rasmiya – Anwar
1987: Al Makhtufa – Hussien
1987: The Wife of an Important Man – Hesham
1987: El Beih El Bawwab – Abdulsamee
1988: Monsieur le directeur
1988: Al-Darga Al-Thalitha (The third Class) – Sorour
1988: Dreams of Hind and Camilia – Eid
1988: Escape – Montaser Abdel Ghafour
1989: Those Guys – Zaki Al Humsani
1990: One Woman Is Not Enough – Hussam
1990: Kaboria – Hassan Hudhud
1990: El-Baydha Wal Hagar – Mustataa
1990: Al Embrator – Zeinhom Abdel-Haq
1990: Al Beh Al bawab (The Rich guard)
1991: El heroob – Montaser
1991: Al-Ra'i wal Nisaa (The Shepherd and the Women)
1992: Dhid el hokouma – Mustafa Khalaf
1992: Al Basha – Hazem El Shennawy
1993: Sawwaq el hanem – Hamada
1993: Mr Karate
1994: Al ragol al talet
1996: Esstakoza – Abbass
1996: Abo Dahab – Abo Dahab
1996: Nasser 56 – President Gamal Abdel Nasser
1996: Nazwa
1996: Hysteria
1997: Hassan Ellol (Hassan)  – Hassan
1998: El Batal (The Hero)
1998: Edhak El-Sora Tetlaa’ Helwa (Smile to make the photo looks good, Sherif Arafa) – Sayed Gharib
2000: Ard el khof (The Land of Fear) – Yehia
2001: Ayyam El Sadat (The Days of Sadat, Mohamed Khan) – President Anwar Sadat
2003: Ma'ali al Wazir – Ra'fat Rostom
2005–2006: Halim (directed by Sherif Arafa) – Abdel Halim Hafez (final film role)

See also 
 Top 100 Egyptian films
List of Egyptian films of the 1980s
List of Egyptian films of the 1990s
 Salah Zulfikar filmography
 Soad Hosny filmography

References

External links 
 
 Ahram Weekly, 31 March – 6 April 2005

1949 births
2005 deaths
Egyptian male television actors
Deaths from lung cancer in Egypt
Egyptian male film actors
Egyptian Muslims
People from Zagazig